Ilya Borodin may refer to:
 Ilya Borodin (footballer)
 Ilya Borodin (swimmer)